Ceryx infranigra is a moth of the  subfamily Arctiinae. It was described by Strand in 1912. It is found in Equatorial Guinea.

References

Ceryx (moth)
Moths described in 1894
Insects of Cameroon
Moths of Africa